Nucleolin is a protein that in humans is encoded by the NCL gene.

Gene 

The human NCL gene is located on chromosome 2 and consists of 14 exons with 13 introns and spans approximately 11kb. The intron 11 of the NCL gene encodes a small nucleolar RNA, termed U20.

Function 

Nucleolin is the major nucleolar protein of growing eukaryotic cells. It is found associated with intranucleolar chromatin and pre-ribosomal particles. It induces chromatin decondensation by binding to histone H1. It is thought to play a role in pre-rRNA transcription and ribosome assembly. May play a role in the process of transcriptional elongation. Binds RNA oligonucleotides with 5'-UUAGGG-3' repeats more tightly than the telomeric single-stranded DNA 5'-TTAGGG-3' repeats.

Nucleolin is also able to act as a transcriptional coactivator with Chicken Ovalbumin Upstream Promoter Transcription Factor II (COUP-TFII).

Clinical significance 

Midkine and pleiotrophin bind to cell-surface nucleolin as a low affinity receptor. This binding can inhibit HIV infection.

Nucleolin at the cell surface is the receptor for the Respiratory Syncytial Virus (RSV) fusion protein. Interference with the nucleolin - RSV fusion protein interaction has been shown to be therapeutic against RSV infection in cell cultures and animal models.

Interactions 

Nucleolin has been shown to interact with:

 MTDH, 
 CSNK2A2, 
 Centaurin, alpha 1, 
 HuR,
 NPM1, 
 P53, 
 PPP1CB, 
 S100A11, 
 Sjogren syndrome antigen B, 
 TOP1,  and
 Telomerase reverse transcriptase.

References

Further reading 

 
 
 
 
 
 
 
 
 
 
 
 
 
 
 
 
 

Proteins